The girls' singles of the tournament 2009 BWF World Junior Championships was held on 28 October–1 November 2009. Thai player Ratchanok Inthanon took out the girls' singles final as she defeated fellow countrywoman Porntip Buranaprasertsuk in three sets.

Seeds 

  Chen Xiaojia (semi-final)
  Febby Angguni (second round)
  Ana Rovita (quarter-final)
  Natalia Perminova (third round)
  Porntip Buranaprasertsuk (final)
  Ratchanok Inthanon (champion)
  Lisa Heidenreich (second round)
  Siti Anida Lestari Qoryatin (quarter-final)
  Tee Jing Yi (quarter-final)
  Alina Hammes (second round)
  Lene Clausen (fourth round)
  Fabienne Deprez (third round)
  Sapsiree Taerattanachai (fourth round)
  Sayaka Takahashi (third round)
  Iris Tabeling (third round)
  Chen Jiayuan (fourth round)

Draw

Finals

Top half

Section 1

Section 2

Section 3

Section 4

Bottom half

Section 5

Section 6

Section 7

Section 8

References

2009 BWF World Junior Championships